Thor Ørvig (14 December 1891 – 17 June 1965) was a Norwegian sailor who competed in the 1920 Summer Olympics. He was a crew member of the Norwegian boat Heira II, which won the gold medal in the 12 metre class (1919 rating).

References

External links
profile

1891 births
1965 deaths
Norwegian male sailors (sport)
Sailors at the 1920 Summer Olympics – 12 Metre
Olympic sailors of Norway
Olympic gold medalists for Norway
Olympic medalists in sailing
Medalists at the 1920 Summer Olympics